, based on a novel by Yūsuke Higuchi, is a 1990 Japanese film directed by Yutaka Kohira.

Cast
Emi Wakui as Asako Sakai
Akira Ōtani as Shun Togawa
Keizō Kanie as Shuzo Togawa
Keiko Saito as Yukiko Muraoka
Shin Takuma as Toshio Kazami
Misa Shimizu as Yoko Asakura
Tappei Shimokawa as Hidematsu Yamada
Yuriko Hoshi as Haruyo Sakai
Karin Yamaguchi as Machiko Togawa
Shinya Owada
Yoshiaki Ueda
Shirō Kishibe
Kenji Sawada as Keigo Sakai

Reception

Awards
12th Yokohama Film Festival
 Won: Best Supporting Actor - Keizō Kanie

References

1990 films
Films based on Japanese novels
Films directed by Yutaka Kohira
1990s Japanese films